Heinrich Beck (born 2 April 1929 - 5 June 2019) was a German philologist who specialized in Germanic studies. A Professor of Ancient German and Nordic Studies at Saarland University and later the University of Bonn, Beck was a co-editor of the second edition of Reallexikon der Germanischen Altertumskunde and one of the world's leading experts on early Germanic culture.

Biography
Hermann Beck was born Nördlingen, Germany on 2 April 1929. Gaining his abitur in Munich in 1949, Beck studied German, Scandinavian and linguistics at the Ludwig Maximilian University of Munich and Reykjavík University. He gained his PhD in Nordic philology and Germanic studies at the Ludwig Maximilian University of Munich in 1962. He completed his habilitation in Germanic studies at the Ludwig Maximilian University of Munich in 1967.

From 1968 to 1978, Beck was Professor of Ancient German and Nordic Studies at Saarland University. From 1978 until his retirement in 1994, Beck was Professor of Ancient German and Nordic Studies at the University of Bonn. 

Beck specialized in the study of Germanic languages and early Germanic literature. He was a prominent expert on early Germanic culture. From 1968 to 2008, Beck was a co-editor of the second edition of Reallexikon der Germanischen Altertumskunde, to which he contributed many articles. He subsequently contributed significantly to Germanische Altertumskunde Online. Beck was awarded the Knight's Cross of the Order of the Falcon in 1988, and an honorary doctor's degree from the University of Minnesota, Minneapolis, in 2002.

See also
 Hermann Reichert
 Rudolf Simek
 Rudolf Much
 Wilhelm Heizmann
 Helmut Birkhan
 Robert Nedoma

Selected works
 Einige vendelzeitliche Bilddenkmäler und die literarische Überlieferung, 1964
 Das Ebersignum im Germanischen, 1965
 (Co-editor) Reallexikon der germanischen Altertumskunde, 1973-2015
 (Co-editor) Untersuchungen zur eisenzeitlichen und frühmittelalterlichen Flur in Mitteleuropa und ihrer Nutzung, 1979-1980
 (Editor) Arbeiten zur Skandinavistik: 6, 1985
 (Editor) Germanenprobleme in heutiger Sicht, 1986
 (Editor) Heldensage und Heldendichtung im Germanischen, 1988
 (Editor) Germanische Rest- und Trümmersprachen, 1989
 (Editor) Germanische Religionsgeschichte, 1992
 (Editor) Snorri Sturlusons Sicht der paganen Vorzeit, 1994
 (Co-editor) Haus und Hof in ur- und frühgeschichtlicher Zeit, 1997
 (Co-editor) De consolatione philologiae, 2000
 (Editor) Studien zur Isländersaga, 2000
 (Co-editor) Zur Geschichte der Gleichung "germanisch-deutsch", 2004
 (Co-editor) Germanische Altertumskunde Online, 2010-
 (Co-editor) Altertumskunde, Altertumswissenschaft, Kulturwissenschaft, 2012
 (Co-editor) Snorri Sturluson: Historiker, Dichter, Politiker, 2013

Sources
 
 Wilfried Kürschner: Linguisten-Handbuch. Gunter Narr Verlag, Tübingen 1997. .

External links
 Heinrich Beck at the website of the University of Bonn

1929 births
2019 deaths
German editors
German non-fiction writers
German philologists
Germanic studies scholars
Germanists
Knights of the Order of the Falcon
Ludwig Maximilian University of Munich alumni
Old Norse studies scholars
People from Nördlingen
Reykjavík University alumni
Academic staff of Saarland University
Scandinavian studies scholars
Academic staff of the University of Bonn
Members of the Göttingen Academy of Sciences and Humanities